On 20 August 2015, two L-410 Turbolet aircraft on a skydiving formation flight collided mid-air and crashed near the village of Červený Kameň, Slovakia. The aircraft were carrying 17 parachutists and 2 crew each. All four crew members and three skydivers were killed, but the other 31 parachutists managed to jump safely before the aircraft crashed to the ground.

Aircraft
The two aircraft involved were both twin-turboprop L-140 (registrations OM-SAB and OM-ODQ) operated by  Dubnica Air.

Accident
On 20 August 2015 at 9:23 (local time), the two aircraft collided and crashed in a forest near Červený Kameň in the district of Ilava, north-western Slovakia.
Both aircraft were carrying parachutists who were training for the Slavnica 2015 Air Show.  Both aircraft came down in a wooded area after they hit each other at an altitude of around  under unknown circumstances. All four crew members, two from each aircraft, and three parachutists were killed, but 31 others survived by jumping out of the aircraft. Five of the parachutists were treated for minor injuries. There  was a video shot showing that OM-SAB was consumed by fire.

The wreckage of the two aircraft was difficult to access due to the forest terrain near the village where they were found. All victims of the disaster were of Slovakian nationality. One of the crew members was a former Slovak ice hockey player .

References

External links
  for OM-SAB
  for OM-ODQ

Aviation accidents and incidents in 2015
Aviation accidents and incidents in Slovakia
Mid-air collisions
Mid-air collisions involving airliners
Accidents and incidents involving the Let L-410 Turbolet
2015 in Slovakia
August 2015 events in Europe
2015 disasters in Slovakia